The Spanish Republic at War, 1936–1939 is a 2002 monograph by Helen Graham on the Spanish political left before, during, and after the Second Republic.

Bibliography

External links 

 
 Front matter
 Full text via the Internet Archive

2002 non-fiction books
English-language books
Second Spanish Republic
Spanish Civil War books
Books about Spain